Alonnisos, also transliterated as Alonissos, is a Greek island in the Aegean Sea. After Skiathos and Skopelos it is the third member of the Northern Sporades. Alonnisos is also the name of a village on the island, as well as the municipality that encompasses the island and the village.
 
The village of Alonnisos is located on the southern part of the island. It is locally known as Chora and signposted as The Old Village. The main port of the island is located in the southeast and is called Patitiri. There are ferry, catamaran ("flying cat") and hydrofoil ("flying dolphin") services from Patitiri to Volos, Agios Konstantinos, and Thessaloniki on the mainland and to the islands of Skiathos, Skopelos and Skyros. The bay at the southern end of the island is also called Alonnisos.

The Municipality of Alonnisos includes the nearby islands of Adelfoi, Gioura, Kyra Panagia (Pelagos), Peristera, Piperi, Psathoura and Skantzoura.

History
In the Middle Ages and until the 19th century, the island was known as Liadromia. It was renamed in 1838, as it was – mistakenly according to later research – identified with Halonnesus of Antiquity. In reality, the present island of Alonnisos was known as Icus or Ikos to the Ancient Greeks. Under that name, it is mentioned as having been colonised by Cnossians. The fleet of Attalus and the Rhodians sailed past Scyrus to Icus. Phanodemus wrote an account of the island.

Geography
The island is mostly limestone. It is located east of mainland Greece and Magnesia, northeast of Euboea and northwest of the island of Skyros.

The island

Agriculture is widespread on Alonnisos, predominantly mixed farming and vineyards. The main products are almonds, grapes, figs and olives. Pine trees are abundant on the island. While fishing is a popular profession on the island, tourism is now the main industry.

Housing traditionally consists of closely constructed houses with stone walls, which, until 1965, were centered on the capital. A small fortress protected against enemies and pirates. The island and the village were heavily damaged in the 1965 earthquake. Many inhabitants returned not to the village of Alonnisos, but to Patitiri. The old village has been restored in recent years, with rebuilt houses now utilised for tourism.

The beaches around the island consist of pebbles. The ecosystem in the north side of the island is in good condition. The Mediterranean monk seal (Monachus monachus) is common around the island, and in 1992 the Alonnisos Marine Park was created to protect these seals and other animals.

In July 2021, Kostis, a monk seal that was the mascot of the island, was killed, apparently by a spearfisher.

Communities and subdivisions

The Municipality includes several other islands with small resident populations. The 2011 census population was 2,750 inhabitants, of whom only 38 persons lived on the other islands.

Alonnisos Island
Ágios Pétros (Άγιος Πέτρος)
Alónnisos (Αλόννησος)
Chrysi Milia (Χρυσή Μηλιά)
Gérakas (Γέρακας)
Isiomata (Ισιώματα)
Kalamákia (Καλαμάκια)
Marpounta (Μαρπούντα) - abandoned
Mourtero (Μουρτερό)
Patitiri (Πατητήρι)
Steni Vala (Στενή Βάλα)
Votsi (Βότση)

Other islands
Adelfoi (Αδελφοί)
Gioura (Γιούρα)
Kyra Panagia (Κυρά Παναγιά)
Peristera (Περιστέρα)
Piperi (Πιπέρι)
Psathoura (Ψαθούρα)
Skantzoura (Σκάντζουρα)

Historical population

References

External links

Official website 
 National Marine Park of Alonnisos Northern Sporades 
VivaSporades.com 
Alonnisos.net website 

Populated places in the Sporades
Mediterranean port cities and towns in Greece
Landforms of the Sporades
Municipalities of Thessaly
Islands of Thessaly
Territories of the Republic of Venice